Sir Owen Haddon Wansbrough-Jones KBE, CB (1906, Long Stratton, Norfolk, England – 1983, Long Stratton), was a leading academic chemist and soldier whose career included serving as Chief Scientist to the British Ministry of Supply.

Educated at Norwich School, Gresham's School, Holt, and Trinity Hall, Cambridge, he took the degrees of B.A., BSc, and PhD at Cambridge, where he worked under Eric Rideal.

During his career in the Army and later in the Civil Service, he specialised in weapon development.

Career
1930 - 1946 Fellow of Trinity Hall, Cambridge 
1939 - 1945 Served with British Army (with rank of Brigadier)
1945 - 1951 Scientific Adviser to the Army Council 
1951 - 1953 Principal Director for Scientific Research, Ministry of Supply
1953 - 1959 Chief Scientist, Ministry of Supply 
1959 - 1970 Chairman of Albright & Wilson Ltd

Other Positions
 Chairman of the Operational Research Society
 Vice-president, British Industrial Biological Research Association (BIBRA)
 Fellow of the Chemical Society
 Treasurer of the Faraday Society (1949 - 1960)
 Member of the Society of Chemical Industry
 Section Chair of the Society of Chemical Industry (1962 - 1966)

Arms

References

Sources
 The Growth of Operational Research 1939-1964, by Sir Charles Goodeve
Owen Wansbrough-Jones at the Open University Biographical Database
 

1906 births
1983 deaths
People educated at Norwich School
Alumni of Trinity Hall, Cambridge
British Army personnel of World War II
Companions of the Order of the Bath
Fellows of Trinity Hall, Cambridge
Knights Commander of the Order of the British Empire
People educated at Gresham's School
British operations researchers
People from South Norfolk (district)